The National Parks and Wildlife Service South Australia (NPWSSA), formerly a government agency known as National Parks and Wildlife Service (NPWS) and later a service under variously named government departments and branded National Parks and Wildlife and National Parks South Australia, is a South Australian Government service within Department for Environment and Water, responsible for national parks in the state of South Australia. 

The National Parks and Wildlife Service was an agency founded in 1972 under the National Parks and Wildlife Act 1972 to manage protected areas previously under the control of a range of agencies within government.  The NPWS is reported as being a division of the following government departments until September 1993: the Department for the Environment until 11 May 1981, the Department of Environment and Planning until 1992 and the Department of Environment and Land Management. The NPWS was reportedly disbanded when the Department of Environment and Land Management changed its name to the Department of Environment and Natural Resources in September 1993.

The use of its name and logo continued until the introduction of a new logo and the accompanying name "National Parks and Wildlife" in early 1997.

As of 2018, services originally provided by the NPWS were being provided by the Department for Environment and Water under the brand of "National Parks South Australia".

In 2019, the service was branded National Parks and Wildlife Service South Australia, a name it has retained , using the initialism NPWSSA. It administers around 360 parks across South Australia that are subject to the National Parks and Wildlife Act and National Parks Regulations.

See also
Protected areas of South Australia

References

Former government agencies of South Australia
Nature conservation in Australia
1972 establishments in Australia
1993 disestablishments in Australia